The United Rentals Work United 500 is a NASCAR Cup Series stock car race held annually at Phoenix Raceway in Avondale, Arizona since 2005. It is one of two Cup Series races at the track, the other being the Season Finale 500. William Byron is the defending race winner.

Race history
As part of the 2005 NASCAR Realignment, a second date was awarded to Phoenix with Subway sponsorship. As there was already a race sponsored by Subway on the schedule (the now Goody's Headache Relief Shot 500 at Martinsville), the name "Subway Fresh 500" was devised to reduce confusion. Subway later added the word "Fit" to the sponsorship to promote its Fresh Fit combo choices. This event swapped dates with the Food City 500 at Bristol Motor Speedway due to the three-race west coast swing, this event used to be race 2 preceding Daytona and Las Vegas before Atlanta took Phoenix's former spot, the Food City 500 at Bristol used to be race 4 before the Food City 500 moved up four weeks due to bad weather, on April 19, 2015.

With the new 2010 NASCAR start time rule change that starts races only at 1:00 pm, 3:00 pm, and 7:30 pm Eastern Time, track officials were concerned that the new start time (45 minutes earlier than in the past) would put the majority of the race in the day instead of the planned night. At that time of year in Phoenix, sunset takes place at roughly 7:00 pm MST (because Arizona does not observe daylight saving time, this is the same as Pacific Daylight Time). As a result, the race was stretched to  so that the extra  would take place during the day, and most of the race would still take place at night as planned. However, in 2011, the race moved one week after the Daytona 500 in February. The race returned to 312 laps [] and was run on Sunday in the daytime for the first time. In 2015, Phoenix moved from the second to the fourth race of the season in mid-March.

Past winners

Notes
 2010, 2013, 2016–17, 2020, and 2023: These races were extended due to NASCAR overtime.

Multiple winners (drivers)

Multiple winners (teams)

Manufacturer wins

Notable moments
 2007: Jeff Gordon wins for the first time at Phoenix from the pole (the first winner from the pole at Phoenix), scoring his 76th Cup Series win (tying Dale Earnhardt). After the race, Gordon celebrated with a black flag with the #3 of Earnhardt emblazoned on it.
 2011: Jeff Gordon snaps a 66-race winless streak (longest of his career) and ties Cale Yarborough with his 83rd career win.
 2013: Carl Edwards wins in a Subway-sponsored car in the Subway-sponsored race and snaps a 70-race winless streak.

References

External links
 

2005 establishments in Arizona
 
NASCAR Cup Series races
Recurring sporting events established in 2005
Annual sporting events in the United States